Gabriele Simongini (born 1963 in Rome) is an Italian art historian and art critic.
Simongini is a professor at the Accademia di Belle Arti di Roma.
Art critic of the newspaper Il Tempo and essayist. In particular deals with research in Italian abstract art.

Curator of Art Exhibitions

"Arché Show, Bendini, Boille, Mariani, Turcato"L'Aquila Basilica di Santa Maria di Collemaggio 2011
Salvi G.B Prize Edition 61 Sassoferrato 2011
Vertical Thinking Roma, 2012
Matteo Montani show "Andarsene" Andersen Museum, Roma 2014

Books ed Essays

Afro, artista mediterraneo. Le tecniche e i progetti (1948-1975). 
Catalogo della mostra (Chieti, 5 luglio-15 ottobre 2008)
Luciano de Liberato, Se il pennello dialoga con il mouse, Terzocchio, n°5, 2008
Marcello Mariani 1957-2007. La via pittorica al sacro. 
Guelfo, 2007
Le visioni purificatorie nella pittura di Gaetano Memmo	2006
Martín Riwnyj, Ombre di luce, carne fatta d'anima.(Temi d'arte contemporanea) 2005
Astrattismo italiano. Incontri con quindici artisti (I quaderni della quadriennale. Nuova serie), 2005
Confronti da museo. Kiki Fleming, Angela Pellicanò. Tra atmosfere e morfologie del colore, Bargellini museum 2005
Quadriennale Anteprima Torino, 2004
Art Club. 1945-1964. La linea astratta, 1998
Bruno Chersicla. Sculture, 1995
Piero Dorazio. La fantasia dell'arte nella vita moderna. Opere recenti, 1992
Bruno Gorgone (Arte e artisti liguri), 1992
Paolo Consorti. Primordiale

Honors 
Margutta Prize, Roma 2002

References

1963 births
Living people
Academic staff of the Accademia di Belle Arti di Roma
Italian art historians
Italian male non-fiction writers
Italian art critics